The news media or news industry are forms of mass media that focus on delivering news to the general public or a target public. These include news agencies, newspapers, newsmagazines, news channels, news websites, etc.

History 
Some of the first news circulations occurred in Renaissance Europe. These handwritten newsletters contained news about wars, economic conditions, and social customs and were circulated among merchants. The first printed news appeared by the late 1400s in German pamphlets that contained content that was often highly sensationalized. The first newspaper written in English was The Weekly Newes, published in London in 1621. Several papers followed in the 1640s and 1650s. In 1690, the first American newspaper was published by Richard Pierce and Benjamin Harris in Boston. However, it did not have permission from the government to be published and was immediately suppressed.

In the United States 

In 1729, Benjamin Franklin began writing a new form of newspaper that was more satirical and more involved in civic affairs than previously seen. In 1735, John Peter Zenger was accused of seditious libel by the governor of New York, William Cosby. Zenger was found not guilty, largely in part to his attorney Andrew Hamilton, who later wrote a paper in which he argued that newspapers should be free to criticize the government as long as it was true. Later, with the ratification of the Bill of Rights in 1791, freedom of the press would be guaranteed by the First Amendment.

In the 1830s, newspapers started seeking commercial success and turned toward reportage. This began with the New York Sun in 1833. Advancements in technology made it cheaper to print newspapers and "penny papers" emerged. These issues sought out local news and coverage of society. Later, news-gathering became a central function of newspapers. With the invention of the telegraph in 1845, the "inverted pyramid" structure of news was developed. Through the latter half of the 1800s, politics played a role in what newspapers published. By the end of the century, modern aspects of newspapers, such as banner headlines, extensive use of illustrations, "funny pages," and expanded coverage of organized sporting events, began to appear. Also, media consolidation began with many independent newspapers becoming part of "chains".

The early 1900s saw Progressive Era journalists using a new style of investigative journalism that revealed the corrupt practices of government officials. These exposing articles became featured in many newspapers and magazines. The people who wrote them became labeled as "muckrakers". They became very influential and were a vital force in the Progressive reform movement. However, after 1912 muckraking declined. The public began to think the exposés were sensationalized, but they did make a great impact on future policies.

During the 1920s, radio became a news medium, and was a significant source of breaking news. Although, during World War I, radio broadcasts in America were only given information about Allied victories because Great Britain had a monopoly on the transatlantic radio lines. For the newspapers, the government suppressed any radical or German papers during and after the war.

With the introduction of the television came The Communications Act of 1934. It was an agreement between commercial television and the people of the United States that established that: The airways are public property; Commercial broadcasters are licensed to use the airways; The main condition for use will be whether the broadcaster served "the public interest, convenience, and necessity." During the Vietnam War, the media reporting directly challenged the government, drawing attention to the "credibility gap" — official lies and half-truths about the war.

Television news continued to expand during the 1970s, and by 1990, more than half of American homes had cable systems and nationally oriented newspapers expanded their reach. With technological advancements in the newsroom, notably the Internet, a new emphasis on computer-assisted reporting and a new blending of media forms emerged, with one reporter preparing the same story in print, online, and on camera for a newspaper's cable station.

Etymology

A "medium" (plural "media") is a carrier of something. Common things carried by media include information, art, or physical objects. A medium may provide transmission or storage of information or both.
The industries which produce news and entertainment content for the mass media are often called "the media" (in much the same way the newspaper industry is called "the press"). In the late 20th century it became commonplace for this usage to be construed as singular ("The media is...") rather than as the traditional plural.

"Press" is the collective designation of media vehicles that carry out journalism and other functions of informative communication, in contrast to pure propaganda or entertainment communication. The term press comes from the printing press of Johannes Gutenberg in the sixteenth century and which, from the eighteenth century, was used to print newspapers, then the only existing journalistic vehicles. From the middle of the 20th century onwards, newspapers also began to be broadcast (radio news and television news). The advent of the World Wide Web brought with it online newspapers, which then expanded to include online news videos and online streaming news in the 2010s.  The use of the term "press", however, was maintained.

Broadcasting

Broadcasting is the distribution of audio and video signals (programs) to a number of recipients ("listeners" or "viewers") that belong to a large group.  This group may be the public in general, or a relatively large audience within the public.  Thus, an Internet channel may distribute text or music worldwide, while a public address system in (for example) a workplace may broadcast very limited ad hoc soundbites to a small population within its range.

The sequencing of content in a broadcast is called a schedule.

Television and radio programs are distributed through radio broadcasting or cable, often simultaneously.  By coding signals and having decoding equipment in homes, the latter also enables subscription-based channels and pay-per-view services.

A broadcasting organization may broadcast several programs at the same time, through several channels (frequencies), for example BBC One and Two. On the other hand, two or more organizations may share a channel and each use it during a fixed part of the day. Digital radio and digital television may also transmit multiplexed programming, with several channels compressed into one ensemble.

When broadcasting is done via the Internet the term webcasting is often used.

Broadcasting forms a very large segment of the mass media.

Broadcasting to a very narrow range of audience is called narrowcasting.

Television

In a broadcast system (television), journalists or reporters are also involved with editing the video material that has been shot alongside their research, and in working on the visual narrative of the story. Broadcast journalists often make an appearance in the news story at the beginning or end of the video clip.

In television or broadcast journalism, news analysts (also called news-casters or news anchors) examine, interpret, and broadcast news received from various sources of information. Anchors present this as news, either videotaped or live, through transmissions from on-the-scene reporters (news correspondents).

News films ("clips") can vary in length; there are some which may be as long as ten minutes, others that need to fit in all the relevant information and material in two or three minutes. News channels these days have also begun to host special documentary films that stretch for much longer durations and are able to explore a news subject or issue in greater detail.

The desk persons categorise news stories with various formats according to the merit of the story. Such formats include AVO, AVO Byte, Pkg, VO SOT, VOX POP, and Ancho Visual.
 The AVO, or Anchor Voice Over, is the short form of news. The story is written in a gist. According to the script visual is edited. The anchor reads the news while the visual is broadcast simultaneously. Generally, the duration of an AVO is 30 to 40 seconds. The script is three to four lines. At first the anchor starts to read the news, and, after reading one or one-and-a-half lines, the visual is aired, overlapping the face of anchor.
 The AVO Byte has two parts: An AVO, and one or more bytes. This is the same as an AVO, except that as soon as the AVO ends, the Byte is aired.
 The Pkg has three parts: Anchor, Voice Over, and Sign Off. At first a Script is written. A voice over anchor reads the anchor or anchor intro part.

Newspapers

A newspaper is a lightweight and disposable publication (more specifically, a periodical), usually printed on low-cost paper called newsprint. It may be general or of special interest, and may be published daily, weekly, biweekly, monthly, bimonthly, or quarterly.

General-interest newspapers are usually journals of current news on a variety of topics. Those can include political events, crime, business, sports, and opinions (either editorials, columns, or political cartoons). Many also include weather news and forecasts. Newspapers increasingly use photographs to illustrate stories; they also often include comic strips and other entertainment, such as crosswords.

Print journalism 

A story is a single article, news item or feature, usually concerning a single event, issue, theme, or profile of a person. Correspondents report news occurring in the main, locally, from their own country, or from foreign cities where they are stationed.

Most reporters file information or write their stories electronically from remote locations. In many cases, breaking stories are written by staff members, through information collected and submitted by other reporters who are out on the field gathering information for an event that has just occurred and needs to be broadcast instantly. Radio and television reporters often compose stories and report "live" from the scene. Some journalists also interpret the news or offer opinions and analysis to readers, viewers, or listeners. In this role, they are called commentators or columnists.

Reporters take notes and also take photographs or shoot videos, either on their own, by citizens or through a photographer or camera person. In the second phase, they organize the material, determine the focus or emphasis (identify the peg), and finally write their stories. The story is then edited by news or copy-editors (U.S. style) or sub-editors in Europe, who function from the news desk. The headline of the story is decided by the news desk, and practically never by the reporter or the writer of the piece. Often, the news desk also heavily re-writes or changes the style and tone of the first draft prepared by the reporter / writer originally. Finally, a collection of stories that have been picked for the newspaper or magazine edition, are laid out on dummy (trial) pages, and after the chief editor has approved the content, style and language in the material, it is sent for publishing. The writer is given a byline for the piece that is published; his or her name appears alongside the article. This process takes place according to the frequency of the publication. News can be published in a variety of formats (broadsheet, tabloid, magazine and periodical publications) as well as periods (daily, weekly, semi-weekly, fortnightly or monthly).

Newsmagazines

A newsmagazine,  is a usually weekly magazine featuring articles on current events. News magazines generally go more in-depth into stories than newspapers, trying to give the reader an understanding of the context surrounding important events, rather than just the facts.

Newsreels

A newsreel was a documentary film common in the first half of the 20th century, that regularly released in a public presentation place containing filmed news stories.

Created by Pathé Frères of France in 1908, this form of film was a staple of the typical North American, British, and Commonwealth countries (especially Canada, Australia and New Zealand), and throughout European cinema programming schedule from the silent era until the 1960s when television news broadcasting completely supplanted its role.

Online journalism

Online journalism is reporting and other journalism produced or distributed via the Internet. The Internet has allowed the formal and informal publication of news stories through mainstream media outlets, social media platforms, as well as blogs and other self-published news stories. Journalists working on the Internet have been referred to as J-Bloggers, a term coined by Australian Media Academic Dr Nicola Goc to describe journalists who [blog] and [blog]gers who produce journalism. "J-Bloggers: Internet bloggers acting in the role of journalists disseminating newsworthy information, who subscribe to the journalistic ideals of an obligation to the truth and the public's right to know".

An early leader was The News & Observer in Raleigh, North Carolina, USA.

Many news organizations based in other media also distribute news online. How much they take advantage of the medium varies. Some news organizations use the web only or primarily.

The Internet challenges traditional news organizations in several ways. They may be losing classified ads to Web sites, which are often targeted by interest instead of geography. The advertising on news web sites is sometimes insufficient to support the investment.

Even before the Internet, technology and perhaps other factors were dividing people's attention, leading to more but narrower media outlets.

Online journalism also leads to the spread of independent online media such as openDemocracy and the UK, Wikinews as well as allowing smaller news organizations to publish to a broad audience.

Streaming Journalism 

Live online streaming journalism began on various online platforms in the late 2010s, such as youtube.com and twitch.tv (which began primarily as a live streaming platform targeting gamers, then expanding into non-gaming topics including news and political reporting and commentary).

Tea accounts are a rising class of social media accounts on YouTube, Twitter, and Instagram that report on the latest news and gossip on the internet. These content creators are known to create an eco-system of drama and further escalate online scandals. While mainstream news outlets often fail to report news on influencers and internet celebrities, tea accounts have capitalized on this opportunity to meet the great demand for such news stories. Notable tea accounts on YouTube include the Shade Room and DramaAlert.

News coverage and new media 
By covering news, politics, weather, sports, entertainment, and vital events, the daily media shape the dominant cultural, social and political picture of society. Beyond the media networks, independent news sources have evolved to report on events which escape attention or underlie the major stories.  In recent years, the blogosphere has taken reporting a step further, mining down to the experiences and perceptions of individual citizens.

An exponentially growing phenomenon, the blogosphere can be abuzz with news that is overlooked by the press and TV networks. Due to the rise of social media involvement in news, the most common news value has become entertainment in recent years. Apropos of this was Robert F. Kennedy Jr.'s 11,000-word Rolling Stone article apropos of the 2004 United States presidential election, published June 1, 2006.  By June 8, there had been no mainstream coverage of the documented allegations by President John F. Kennedy's nephew. On June 9, this sub-story was covered by a Seattle Post-Intelligencer article.

Media coverage during the 2008 Mumbai attacks highlighted the use of new media and Internet social networking tools, including Twitter and Flickr, in spreading information about the attacks, observing that Internet coverage was often ahead of more traditional media sources. In response, traditional media outlets included such coverage in their reports. However, several outlets were criticized as they did not check for the reliability and verifiability of the information. Some public opinion research companies have found that a majority or plurality of people in various countries distrust the news media.

Fake news 

Fake news articles are untruthful-on-purpose stories. They have the purpose of misleading the reader to think one way. With the rise of new media through social media, there has been an increase in fake news. This increase in fake news has progressed over time and continues to show, especially in today's media. The use of Twitter, Facebook, etc. has made it easier for false or misleading articles to be seen. The amount of misleading news articles that are produced are causing audiences to believe that every piece of information on the internet is true. A major problem is the issue of unbiased articles showing up in a timeline next to fake articles. This makes it hard for others to determine between what is fact and what is opinion. Specifically, the media coverage during the 2016 United States presidential election saw numerous misleading articles for both candidates.

Media integrity 
Media integrity refers to the ability of a news media outlet to serve the public interest and democratic process, making it resilient to institutional corruption within the media system, economy of influence, conflicting dependence and political clientelism. Media integrity encompasses following qualities of a media outlet:
 independence from private or political interests
 transparency about own financial interests
 commitment to journalism ethics and standards
 responsiveness to citizens
The concept was devised particularly for the media systems in the region of South East Europe, within the project South East European Media Observatory, gathering organisations which are part of the South East European Network for Professionalization of Media (SEENPM).

See also

 Court of public opinion
 Hostile media effect
 Journalism
 Media bias in the United States
 Media regulation
 News media in the United States
 News media in Germany
 News presenter
 Yellow press

References

External links

Chart – Real and Fake News (2016)/Vanessa Otero (basis) (Mark Frauenfelder)
Chart – Real and Fake News (2014) (2016)/Pew Research Center